The 2008–09 season was Leicester City F.C.'s 104th season in the English football league system and their first and, to date, only season in the third tier of English football, after being relegated to League One the previous season.

Under the stewardship of new manager Nigel Pearson (who managed to become the first Leicester manager in five years to last an entire season), Leicester comfortably took the League One title to earn instant promotion back to the Championship, which included a club record run of 23 games league unbeaten between 1 November and 7 March. Leicester also broke club records for the most points ever gained in a season (96), the most league wins ever gained in a season (27) and the fewest league defeats in a season (4), the latter record especially impressive considering the amount of league seasons Leicester have had to play fewer than 46 games.

Matty Fryatt also became the first Leicester player to score over 30 goals in one season since legendary striker Arthur Rowley, 52 years previously.

Players

2008-09 squad
Only includes players given a squad number. The squad listed is the squad which Leicester finished the season with.

Kit and sponsorship

Leicester City retained the previous season's home kit. A yellow away kit and a black third kit were also used.

The kits were produced by German company Jako and sponsored by British company Topps Tiles.

Pre-Season Friendlies
The Leicester City players reported back for Pre-Season  on 1 July 2008. They played the following Friendlies:

Transfers

In

Out

Loans in

Loans out

Results

Football League One
Leicester City scores given first

1 - Match postponed due to International call-ups.
2 - In some match reports, this goal is mistakenly awarded to Mark Davies

FA Cup
Leicester City scores given first

Football League Cup
Leicester City scores given first

Football League Trophy
Leicester City scores given first

1 Leicester won 3–1 on penalties.

Awards

Club awards
At the end of the season, Leicester's annual award ceremony including categories voted for by the players and backroom staff, the supporters and the supporters club, saw the following players recognised for their achievements for the club throughout the 2009–10 season.

Divisional awards

League One statistics

League One table

Club standings

Club statistics

Appearances

Note: Subs in brackets.

Top scorers
Note: In some records, Bruno Berner's goal vs. Carlisle United on 13 December 2008 is mistakenly recorded as being scored by Mark Davies.

Most assists

Disciplinary record

All Stats obtained from LCFC.com

References

Leicester City F.C. seasons
Leicester City